A hackman may be a coachman.

The word may also refer to:
 Hackman (surname)
 Hackmans Gate, hamlet in Worcestershire, England
 Samuel E. Hackman Building, historic building in Hartsburg, Missouri
 Hackman (company), a cutlery firm founded in Finland in 1790